Jumadi Abdi (14 March 1983 – 15 March 2009) was an Indonesian football player who played as a midfielder. He last played for PKT Bontang. He died eight days after a collision with Persela's player on 7 March 2009.

Club
Abdi made a debut career while playing for Persiba in Divisi Utama. He played in 2001-2002. After Persiba promoted he moved to Pelita Krakatau Steel for two seasons. Then, he moved to Persikota. Last, he played for PKT Bontang.

National team
Abdi had played for Indonesia national under-23 football team in 2005 SEA Games. He also played for Indonesia national under-20 football team, though he had yet to make his full senior debut.

Death
Abdi was sent to hospital after having a collision with Persela's player Deny Tarkas on 7 March 2009 at Mulawarman Stadium. He suffered an injury to the stomach and had surgery on his intestines on 10 March. He died on 15 March 2009 at PT Pupuk Kalimantan Timur Hospital, Bontang. He was buried at Taman Merdeka Public Cemetery.

Personal life
Abdi was born on 14 Maret 1983. He was the last child of seven siblings. He planned to marry Robiyatul Adawiyah, his high school friend on 5 April 2009.

References 

1983 births
2009 deaths
Indonesian footballers
Persiba Balikpapan players
People from Balikpapan
Sportspeople from East Kalimantan
Association football midfielders
Association football players who died while playing
Sport deaths in Indonesia